Nana is a cross-platform C++ library for creating graphical user interfaces.  It uses a platform-independent API and currently supports Windows, Linux and FreeBSD.

Nana is free and open-source software, licensed under the Boost Software License.

Architecture and design
Nana is an object-oriented widget toolkit using generic programming and written in Standard C++. It can therefore be compiled by any Standard C++ compiler (VC2013, GCC/MinGW, Clang).

The primary design goal of Nana is to make things simple and intuitive to C++ developers: it therefore uses many advanced C++ features, such as templates, standard libraries, exception and RTTI.  It fully supports C++11 since 2012, giving the developers the freedom to use various modern C++ features such as lambda functions, smart pointers and the standard library.

Language bindings
Nana was written in C++ and targets only this language.

The following Nana example creates a window with a "Hello, World" caption and a "Quit" button:
#include <nana/gui/wvl.hpp>
#include <nana/gui/widgets/button.hpp>

int main()
{
     using namespace nana;
     form fm;                   // The form is a window with title bar and a sizable border frame, 
     fm.caption("Hello World");
     button btn(fm, rectangle(20, 20, 150, 30));
     btn.caption("Quit");
     btn.events().click(API::exit);  // API::exit is a function that is triggered on click
     fm.show();
     exec();
}

Versions

The current version 1.7.4 was released on May 16, 2020.

According to the project's SourceForge repository:

 In 2015, 10 versions 1.x.x were released.
 Between mid 2013 and begin 2015, 24 versions 0.x.x were released, .

The SourceForge repository of the alpha release of the project, traces the first release 0.1.0 back to December 4, 2007.

See also

 gtkmm (C++ binding of GTK+)
 FLTK
 FOX toolkit
 Juce
 Qt
 VCF
 wxWidgets - cross platform open source C++ widgets toolkit developed by community
 Ultimate++
 List of widget toolkits

References

External links
 Official website

Cross-platform free software
Free computer libraries
Free software programmed in C++
Widget toolkits
X-based libraries
Software using the Boost license